This is a list of radio stations in the state of Nuevo León, in Amplitude Modulated and Frequency Modulated bands.

Ciudad Anáhuac

Cerralvo

Doctor Arroyo

Galeana

Lampazos de Naranjo

Linares 

Frequency Modulation

Montemorelos 

Amplitude Modulation

Frequency Modulation

Monterrey Metropolitan Area 

Amplitude Modulation

Frequency Modulation

Sabinas Hidalgo 

Amplitude Modulation

Frequency Modulation

ND: No disponible

Defunct formats

Linares 

Frequency Modulation

Monterrey 

Amplitude Modulation

Frequency Modulation

Closed stations

Linares 

Amplitude Modulation

Monterrey 

Amplitude Modulation

Notes 

 All the amplitude modulated radio stations in Nuevo León that have acquired an FM frequency, means that they are going to change frequency.

References 

Nuevo Leon